Jerome Morgan (June 1931 – 1 November 2007), better known as Barry Morgan, was a British drummer for Blue Mink, CCS and other bands. He was the owner of Morgan Studios.

Personal life and career

Morgan was born in London, England in November 1944. He played drums on the British merchant fleet cruise ships in the early 1960s, and later for singer Tom Jones for ten years. Barry and his wife operated the Arena Theater in Houston. AllMusic lists 185 credits between 1964 and 2012. His son Brett Morgan also became a session drummer.

Discography

As leader/co-leader
1971: Bass Guitar and Percussion, Volume 1. Volume 2.
1979: Percussion Spectrum - Barry Morgan and Ray Cooper
1983: Patterns In Rhythm
Wonderin'

As sideman

With Blue Mink and C.C.S.
 C.C.S.

With Gullivers People, Electric Coconut and Elton John
 Step into Christmas
 Madman Across the Water
 Tumbleweed Connection
 Elton John

With the Walker Brothers 
 No Regrets
 Lines

With David Bowie
 Bowie at the Beeb
 The World of David Bowie

Various
Histoire de Melody Nelson (Serge Gainsbourg)
Candles in the Rain (Melanie)
Izitso (Cat Stevens)
All This and World War II
Cinema (Elaine Paige)
Son of Schmilsson (Harry Nilsson)
Jeff Wayne's Musical Version of The War of the Worlds
 At the End of a Perfect Day (Chris de Burgh)
A Possible Projection of the Future / Childhood's End
Greatest Love Classics
Mallard
Evita
Amours des feintes
The Mouse and the Mask
In Hoagland

References

External links
Photo of Morgan playing the drums
Photo of Morgan from his Tom Jones period, July 1981

1944 births
2007 deaths
English drummers
British male drummers
English session musicians
Blue Mink members
CCS (band) members
20th-century British male musicians